"Mississippi Queen" is a song by American rock band Mountain.

Mississippi Queen may also refer to:
Mississippi Queen (steamboat), a paddle wheel driven river steamboat
Mississippi Queen (board game), a 1997 German board game

See also
Mississippi River
Delta Queen
 Queen of the Mississippi (2015 ship)
 Queen of the Mississippi (2017 ship)